Tarset is a civil parish in Northumberland, England, created in 1955 from parts of Bellingham, Tarset West and Thorneyburn parishes. Today it shares a parish council with the adjacent parish of Greystead. It is partly located within the Northumberland National Park, and also mostly within the international dark skies park.

History 

The Comyns, Scottish knights, were established in Tynedale in the 12th century and the manor of Tarset was granted to William Comyn in around 1222. Licence to crenellate was granted to John Comyn in 1267, and Tarset Castle was built half a mile south-west of the present village, of which only grassed-over remains can now be seen.  Two miles to the south-west on Birks Moor are the remains of the fortified house known as Dally Castle, believed to have been erected by David Linsey in his manor of Chirdon.

Governance 
Tarset is in the parliamentary constituency of Hexham.

Demography 
Tarset has a population of 196. In 1831, its population was 169.  In 1968, its population was 149.

Transport 
Tarset was served by Tarset railway station on the Border Counties Railway which linked the Newcastle and Carlisle Railway, near Hexham, with the Border Union Railway at Riccarton Junction. The first section of the route was opened between Hexham and Chollerford in 1858, the remainder opening in 1862. The line was closed to passengers by British Railways in 1956. Part of the line is now beneath the surface of Kielder Water.

Notable people 
John Candlish – politician, Liberal mayor of Sunderland, shipbuilder and glass-bottle manufacturer, owner of Sunderland Beacon and founder of Sunderland News.

Matthew Festing – Prince and Grand Master of the Sovereign Military Order of Malta from 2008 until his resignation in 2017

References

Further reading

External links
Tarset Community Website
A detailed history of Tarset Castle
Images of Tarset Castle site
Location and History of Greenhaugh and Tarset (Northumberland National Park Authority)
Tarset on Google Maps
Black Middens Bastle House (English Heritage)
Tarset Weather (Gatehouse Weather Station)
Sidwood (Forestry England)

Civil parishes in Northumberland